Etaracizumab, also known as MEDI-522, trade name Abegrin, is a humanized monoclonal antibody which is being investigated for the treatment of metastatic melanoma, prostate cancer, ovarian cancer and various other types of cancer. It is manufactured by MedImmune.

It is an enhanced iteration of Vitaxin, also known as MEDI-523. Both are derived from the mouse antibody LM609.

References 

Monoclonal antibodies for tumors
AstraZeneca brands